Shibdas Ghosh (5 August 1923 – 5 August 1976) was an Indian communist politician. He was involved in the Communist movement in India for several decades. He was also the founding general secretary of Socialist Unity Centre of India (Communist).

Ghosh was born in the Dhaka District of British India, to a lower-middle-class family. Passing 10th standard from his village school at the age of 13 he joined the Anushilan Samity to participate in the independence movement of India. He was attracted to Manabendranath Roy's ideologies at a very early age. In 1942 he joined the Quit India movement. He was later arrested and incarcerated for three years. There he thoroughly studied Marxism-Leninism. Later along with some colleagues such as Nihar Mukherjee he organised SUCI(C) in 1948. He died on his 53rd birthday in 1976.

References

External links
 SUCI (C) Central Committee's Homage to Shibdas Ghosh
 Marxists Internet Archive: Shibdas Ghosh

Selected speeches
Why SUCI(C) is the only genuine Communist Party in India
Marxism and the development of human society
 Some aspects of Marxism and Dialectical Materialism 
On communal problem
The cultural movement in India and our tasks 
A few economic problems
Self-criticism of the Communist camp
On the report of the Twentieth Congress of the CPSU
An appeal to the leaders of the international communist movement
Some questions on the Way the Cuban Crisis had been Solved

Socialist Unity Centre of India (Communist) politicians
Indian Marxist writers
Indian political writers
Stalinism
Anti-revisionists
Indian atheists
Anushilan Samiti
1923 births
1976 deaths
Indian male writers
Indian Communist writers
20th-century Indian essayists
Bengali writers
Writers from Dhaka
20th-century Bangladeshi people
Bangladeshi male writers
Bengali Hindus
20th-century Bengalis
West Bengal politicians
Indian newspaper journalists
Indian newspaper founders